Narayanpur town  is the administrative headquarters  of Narayanpur district of the Indian state of Chhattisgarh. It is one of two new districts created on 11 May 2007, originating from the Bastar district.

Narayanpur is very much affected by the Naxalites, the main reason that the tribes of this region are disconnected from economic development. Ramakrishna Mission started in 1985 has worked to compose these tribes. Development has included schools, playground, and a stadium for the tribes.   

Some Christian missionaries are also working in Narayanpur, which is helping develop the area.

How to reach Narayanpur:

Regular buses are available from Raipur to Narayanpur via Rajnandgaon and Jagdalpur. The distance between Narayanpur and Jagdalpur is 120km, while the distance between Narayanpur and Rajnandgaon is 180km.

References

Cities and towns in Narayanpur district